Raising Your Voice...Trying to Stop an Echo is the second studio album by American ambient/post-rock band Hammock. It was released on November 21, 2006 on Darla Records. It was reissued in 2011 by the band's own label, Hammock Music.

Reception

Raising Your Voice...Trying to Stop an Echo was met with positive critical reception. In his review for AllMusic, James Mason stated that, with this album, Hammock "leave behind the dream pop scene from whence they came, and become a band creating truly unique music -- transcendent shoegaze," further stating that this album left Hammock "at the top of their game."
Joe Tangari, writing for Pitchfork, suggested that Raising Your Voice... was "an unassuming record that speaks to all those things in our lives that aren't tangible," and that the music was "meant to be a contrail in a solid blue sky, a smear of sound that goes oddly well with any number of emotional states."

Jason MacNeil, writing for PopMatters, stated that it's the album's "longing, melodic, meloncholic, and thoughtful texture that seems to tug at one's heartstrings from start to finish."  MacNeil concluded his review by stating that "Nothing about this album is less than Grade A+ material, whether it’s the perfect "Disappear Like The Morning..." or the lovely "Passing Away". It’s an album that forces one to reflect on both the highs and lows in one’s life."

American webzine Somewhere Cold listed Raising Your Voice Trying to Stop an Echo No. 2 on their 2006 Somewhere Cold Awards Hall of Fame.

Track listing

References 

Hammock (band) albums
Hammock Music albums
2006 albums